Papercourt Marshes is a   nature reserve in the south-east of the borough of Woking in Surrey. It is managed by the Surrey Wildlife Trust. A roughly  lake and associated surrounds, including the marshes totalling  is designated a biological Site of Special Scientific Interest as Papercourt.

This site has a variety of wetland habitats with marshes, unimproved meadows, streams and flooded gravel pits. More than seventy species of birds breed on Papercourt and ninety species winter there.

The stream, and banks are rich in flora such as greater sweet-grass, reed canary grass and red pondweed.

Access is limited to Papercourt Sailing Club, chosen ecologists and ornithologists.

References

Surrey Wildlife Trust
Sites of Special Scientific Interest in Surrey
Lakes of Surrey
Nature reserves in Surrey